A severance can in law mean the act of severing a piece of land from a larger tract of land.  The severed parcel of land becomes a separate lot (parcel).  Second, it can refer to, in jurisdictions that have the form of co-ownership, the ending of a joint tenancy by act or event other than death.  Third, it can be defined in a definitions clause or table in ways including the removal of a party from an agreement, or a permitted ending of the agreement (e.g. break clause) — in an employment contract/negotiations especially common as to severance pay and other terms of severance — or part of the agreement in which case it may be either capable of forming the heart of a new agreement, that is being superseded or instead varied to be non-binding (avoided) as to future conduct (see voidable contract) and the parties should ensure which meaning is meant in this third range of senses.

Transfer of part
In many jurisdictions, land use laws require that severances of land occur in an orderly fashion by way of plans of subdivision, (estate plans) when multiple lots are being created. In a registered (or other standardised land system) colouring and other conventions may apply to such title plans. To avoid complications, some jurisdictions allow severances of a minor nature to proceed without a plan of subdivision, as long as other criteria are met. In many cases this will only be permitted when reverting a previous combination of the land, in England and Wales, amalgamation (land). In England and Wales in unregistered land (around 15% of the total) any such severance (transfer of part) triggers compulsory registration of that new parcel (see registered land in English law. In Canada, approval of qualifying minor severances are often referred to as "consents", and the authority to grant consents is usually given to local planning bodies such as committees of adjustment or land division committees. Colloquially in Canada and the US the term "severance"/"severed lot" is often used to solely refer to such minor land divisions rather than to divisions undertaken by way of the more complicated subdivision process.  Officially and commonly the terms "severed land" and "new parcel/plot/tract/piece of land" are used, synonymously in England and Wales with "severed land" removing all ambiguity.

References

Real property law
Urban studies and planning terminology